Coke is the first album by the former Santana and Azteca band member Coke Escovedo. The album was produced by Patrick Gleeson and released in 1975.

Track listing
"No One to Depend On" 		
"Why Can't We Be Lovers" 		
"Rebirth" 		
"Easy Come Easy Go" 		
"Love Letters" 		
"Hall's Delight" 		
"If I Ever Lose This Heaven" 		
"What Are You Under" 		
"Make It Sweet" 		
"Life is a Tortured Love Affair"

Personnel
Coke Escovedo - Percussion
Harvey Mason, Pete Risso - Drums
Mark Philipps - Bass
Joe Rubino - Guitar
Frank Mercurio - Keyboards
Vince Denim - Saxophone on "Hall's Delight"
Forrest Buchtel, Mike Kirkhouse, Ron Smith, Vince Denim - Horns
Joanna Hervig, Miriam Dye, Nathan Rubin, Roy Malan, Teresa Adams - Strings
Calvin Tillery, Linda Tillery - Lead Vocals
Julia Tillman, Maxine Willard - Backing Vocals

Charts

References

External links
 Coke Escovedo-Coke at Discogs

1975 debut albums
Coke Escovedo albums
Mercury Records albums